Neela Vaanam is a 1965 Indian Tamil-language film, directed by P. Madhavan and produced by Varathan. The film stars Sivaji Ganesan, Devika and Rajasree. It was released on 10 December 1965.

Plot 

Babu and Vimala are lovers. However, under a circumstance Babu is forced to marry the dying Gowri without the acknowledgement of Vimala. Vimala and Gowri are friends. Shocked by her lover's marriage to Gowri, Vimala and Babu tried to keep their past as a secret from Gowri. What will happen to Gowri forms the rest of the story.

Cast 
Sivaji Ganesan as Babu
Devika as Gowri
Rajasree as Vimala
S. V. Sahasranamam as Somanathan
V. K. Ramasamy as Varatharajan
Nagesh as Prakash
Seethalakshmi as Kamala
Kumari Padmini as Thilagam
I. S. R as Thilagam's husband
Harikrishnan as Sharma
Comedy Shanmugam as Babu's friend
 Pakoda Kadhar

Production 
Neela Vaanam was directed by P. Madhavan and produced by Varadan under Pattu Films. The screenplay was written by K. Balachander. Cinematography was handled by Karnan, and the editing by R. Devarajan.

Soundtrack 
The music was composed by M. S. Viswanathan and the lyrics were penned by Kannadasan.

Release and reception 
Neela Vaanam was released on 10 December 1965, and distributed by Sivaji Films. T. M. Ramachandran of Sport and Pastime called it a "poor film" and criticised Madhavan's direction as "naive". He also noted "There is nothing much to write home about K. Balachander's screenplay and dialogue" but called Viswanathan's music "pleasing". Kalki wrote .

References

External links 
 

1960s Tamil-language films
1965 films
Films directed by P. Madhavan
Films scored by M. S. Viswanathan
Films with screenplays by K. Balachander